Acroceronia is a genus of flies in the family Tachinidae, containing only the species Acroceronia elquiensis.

References

Tachinidae genera
Monotypic Brachycera genera